Caltrain (reporting mark JPBX) is a California commuter rail line serving the San Francisco Peninsula and Santa Clara Valley (Silicon Valley). The southern terminus is in San Jose at Tamien station with weekday rush hour service running as far as Gilroy. The northern terminus of the line is in San Francisco at 4th and King Streets. Caltrain has 28 regular stops, one limited-service weekday-only stop (College Park), one weekend-only stop (Broadway), and one football-only stop (Stanford). While average weekday ridership in 2019 exceeded 63,000, impacts of the COVID-19 pandemic have been significant: in August 2022, Caltrain had an average weekday ridership of 18,600 passengers.

Caltrain is governed by the Peninsula Corridor Joint Powers Board (PCJPB) which consists of agencies from the three counties served by Caltrain: Santa Clara, San Francisco, and San Mateo. Each member agency has three representatives on a nine-member Board of Directors. The member agencies are the Santa Clara Valley Transportation Authority, the San Francisco Municipal Transportation Agency, and the San Mateo County Transit District (SamTrans).

Historically served by diesel locomotives, Caltrain is electrifying  of its route between 4th and King and Tamien; diesel trains will remain in service for trains to Gilroy.

History

Southern Pacific service

The original commuter railroad was built in 1863 under the authority of the San Francisco & San Jose Railroad; it was purchased by Southern Pacific (SP) in 1870.

SP double-tracked the line in 1904 and rerouted it via the Bayshore Cutoff. After 1945, ridership declined with the rise in automobile use; in 1977 SP petitioned the state Public Utilities Commission to discontinue the commuter operation because of ongoing losses. California legislators wrote Assembly Bill 1853 in 1977 to allow local transit districts along the line to make bulk purchases of tickets for resale at a loss, subsidizing commuters reliant on the Peninsula Commute until 1980; more importantly, the bill also authorized the California Department of Transportation (Caltrans) to begin negotiating with SP to operate the passenger rail service and acquire the right-of-way between San Bruno and Daly City.

To preserve the commuter service, in 1980 Caltrans contracted with SP and began to subsidize the Peninsula Commute. Caltrans purchased new locomotives and rolling stock, replacing SP equipment in 1985. Caltrans also upgraded stations, added shuttle buses to nearby employers, and dubbed the operation CalTrain.

Joint Powers Board

The Peninsula Corridor Joint Powers Board was formed in 1987 to manage the line. Subsequently, San Mateo and Santa Clara Counties commissioned Earth Metrics, Inc., to prepare an Environmental Impact Report on right-of-way acquisition and expansion of operations. With state and local funding, the PCJPB bought the railroad right of way between San Francisco and San Jose from SP in 1991. As SamTrans advanced most of the local fund used to purchased the right-of-way, it was also agreed that SamTrans would serve as the managing agency until San Francisco and Santa Clara Counties could repay their portions. The following year, PCJPB took responsibility for CalTrain operations and selected Amtrak as the contract operator. PCJPB extended the CalTrain service from San Jose to Gilroy, connecting to VTA Light Rail at Tamien station in San Jose.

In July 1995, CalTrain became accessible to passengers with wheelchairs. Five months later, CalTrain increased the bicycle limit to 24 per train, making the service attractive to commuters in bicycle-friendly cities such as San Francisco and Palo Alto.

In July 1997, the current logo was adopted, and the official name became Caltrain, dropping the capitalized “T”.

In 1998, the San Francisco Municipal Railway extended the N Judah line from Market Street to the San Francisco Caltrain Station at 4th and King streets, providing a direct connection between Caltrain and the Muni Metro system. A year later, VTA extended its light rail service from north Santa Clara to the Mountain View station.

In June 2003, a passenger connection for the Bay Area Rapid Transit (BART) and Caltrain systems opened at Millbrae station just south of the San Francisco International Airport.

In 2008, Caltrain reached an all-time high of 98 trains each weekday.

Caltrain announced on August 19, 2011 a staff recommendation to sign a five-year, $62.5 million contract with TransitAmerica Services, after taking proposals from three other firms, including Amtrak California, which had provided operating employees since 1992. The new operating contract was approved by the full Joint Powers Board at its scheduled September 1 meeting. TransitAmerica Services took over not only the conductor and engineer jobs on the trains, but also dispatching and maintenance of equipment, track, and right-of-way from Amtrak. On May 26, 2012, TransitAmerica took over full operations.

Baby Bullet service

In June 2004, Caltrain finished its two-year CTX (Caltrain Express) project for a new express service called the Baby Bullet. The project entailed new bypass tracks in Brisbane and Sunnyvale as well as a new centralized traffic control system. The Baby Bullet trains reduced travel time by stopping at only four or five stations between San Francisco and San Jose Diridon station; the express trains could overtake local trains at the two locations (near Bayshore and Lawrence stations) where passing loops were added. Travel time for about 46.75 miles between San Francisco and San Jose is 57 minutes (four stops), 59 minutes (five stops) or 61 minutes (six stops), compared to 1 hour 30 minutes for local trains. The CTX project included the purchase of new Bombardier BiLevel Coaches along with MPI MP36PH-3C locomotives. The Baby Bullets proved popular, but many riders had longer commutes on non-bullet trains, some of which would wait for Baby Bullet trains to pass.

Budget crises
In May 2005 Caltrain started a series of fare increases and schedule changes in response to a projected budget shortfall. The frequency of the popular Baby Bullet express trains was increased; two express trains were added in May and another ten were added in August. New Baby Bullet stops, Pattern B stops, were introduced. Another increase of $0.25 in basic fare came in January 2006.

On April 2, 2010, Caltrain announced the need to cut its services by around 50%, as it was required to cut $30 million from its $97 million budget because all three authorities that fund the line were facing financial problems themselves and $10 million a year in previous state funding had been cut. Revenues for both local and state agencies had been steadily declining, as well as ticket revenues at Caltrain itself, and had left all "beyond broke."

On January 1, 2011, Caltrain cut four midday trains but upgraded four weekend trains to Baby Bullet service as a pilot program. This reduced its schedule from 90 to 86 trains each weekday. At the same time, it raised fares $0.25 and continued to contemplate cutting weekday service to 48 trains during commute hours only. By April 2011, Caltrain's board had approved a budget with fare increases to take effect on July 1, 2011, and no service cuts. The budget gap would be closed with another $0.25 fare increase, a $1 parking fee increase to $4, and additional money from other transit agencies and the MTC.

On February 17, 2017, California State Senator Jerry Hill introduced SB 797, which would permit the Peninsula Corridor Joint Powers Board to submit a regional measure for sales tax increase of th of one cent to the voters in the three counties served by Caltrain. The regional measure would require a two-thirds majority (aggregated among the three counties) to pass, and would provide Caltrain with a dedicated revenue source estimated at $100 million per year. For comparison, in fiscal year 2016 (ending June 30, 2016), the operating expenses for Caltrain were $118 million, and farebox revenues were $87 million, leaving approximately $31 million in expenses to be funded by the PCJPB through its member agencies and county government contributions. SB 797 passed the California State Senate in May, and the State Assembly in September, and Governor Brown signed the bill into law in October.

Advocates for the increased tax cited its potential benefits to alleviate congestion along U.S. 101, which Carl Guardino quipped "has become so congested that we've changed its name to the '101 Parking Lot'." Detractors pointed to Caltrain's bureaucracy and stated fares should be increased to improve services instead. A poll of 1,200 voters in early May indicated support was sufficiently strong enough to pass the sales tax increase, if the tax would result in expanding ridership capacity. The poll was sponsored by the Silicon Valley Leadership Group (SVLG), headed by Guardino, which predicted that daily ridership could rise to 250,000 with the improvements in service funded by the dedicated sales tax increase. Potential capital projects which could use the dedicated funding include additional electric multiple units (making electric trains 8-EMU consists, rather than 6-EMU), extended boarding platforms, and the proposed Downtown Rail Extension to the Transbay Transit Center. A dedicated tax was proposed in 2011, contemporaneously with the prior budget crisis, but polls at the time indicated insufficient support. After SVLG's May 2017 poll indicated strong support, they petitioned Hill to act.

By early 2020, the joint powers board was planning to propose a one-eighth-cent sales tax for voter approval later in the year, to provide an estimated $ of dedicated funding for the system, which currently relies on rider fares for 70% of its revenue. This funding would have enabled Caltrain to run 168 trains per weekday, with rush-hour headways of 10 minutes, with the completion of electrification in 2022. BART-like service levels were projected to increase ridership significantly.

In March 2020, Caltrain's ridership dropped by 95% due to the COVID-19 pandemic, resulting in losses of $ per month. The joint powers board recast the sales tax proposal as a way to keep the system afloat. Due to the COVID-19 measures and subsequent loss of approximately 75% of its ridership, Caltrain discontinued Baby Bullet service starting March 17, 2020. Two weeks later, due to continued loss of ridership, Caltrain further cut service from 92 to 42 trains per weekday, starting March 30. Average weekday ridership plummeted from approximately 65,000 (pre-pandemic) to 1,300. By June 15, service was increased to 70 trains per weekday, and limited (skip-stop) service was reinstated; later that month, ridership had recovered to 3,200 per weekday. In July, after the San Francisco Board of Supervisors initially declined to consider the ballot proposal, citing concerns about the system's governance structure, Caltrain officials warned that the agency would run out of operating funds and be forced to suspend service by the end of the year. In August, San Mateo County officials agreed to make Caltrain more independent from SamTrans in exchange for placing the sales tax on the ballot. In November 2020, Measure RR passed which created dedicated funding of a one-eighth cent sales tax. The schedule was adjusted again starting December 14, with slightly fewer weekday trains (68) but more frequent off-peak and weekend service to support essential workers.

The number of weekday trains returned to 70 starting March 22, 2021, and the schedule was adjusted to facilitate transfers to BART at Millbrae. Caltrain began operation with a new schedule that exceeds pre-pandemic service on August 30, 2021; there are 104 trains operated per weekday, including reinstated Baby Bullet service. Headways for popular stations are as low as 15 minutes during peak commute hours (6–9 a.m. and 4–7 p.m.) and 30 minutes throughout the day before 11 p.m. for most stations. The separate Saturday and Sunday schedules were consolidated into a single weekend schedule with 32 trains per weekend day. All stations have a maximum headway of 60 minutes, including weekends, except for a 90-120 minute gap between the earliest weekend trains. In addition, fares were cut in half for September.

Modernization and electrification

The Caltrain Modernization Program will electrify the main line between San Francisco and the San Jose Tamien station, allowing transition from diesel-electric locomotive power to electric rolling stock. Proponents say electrification would improve service times via faster acceleration, allow better scheduling and reduce air pollution and noise. Electrification would also allow future expansion to downtown San Francisco. Electrified vehicles require less maintenance, but electrification will increase required track maintenance by about the same dollar amount, at least initially. The plan calls to electrify the system between San Francisco 4th and King Street station and San Jose Tamien station. Originally scheduled for completion by 2020, the schedule had slipped after three months of construction to December 30, 2021 and then April 22, 2022. At that point, Caltrain plans to use electric multiple units and increase service to six trains per hour in each direction.

The electrification project between San Francisco and Tamien is the first phase, the second phase being from Tamien station to Gilroy. Cost, excluding electric rolling stock, for the first phase was estimated at $471 million (2006 dollars). By 2016, costs had increased to $1.7 billion. Notably, in 2021, Caltrain stated that the overall cost of electrification had risen to $2.44 billion. As part of the Caltrain Modernization Program and mandated by the federal government, positive train control (PTC) was installed along the route between San Francisco and San Jose by late 2015.

Caltrain plans to use lighter electric multiple units that do not comply with the Federal Railroad Administration (FRA) crashworthiness standards, but instead comply with the International Union of Railways (UIC) standards, on the electrified lines. The FRA granted Caltrain a waiver to operate these units, which were previously banned on mixed-use lines with other FRA-compliant rolling stock due to concerns over crashworthiness, after Caltrain submitted simulation data showing UIC-compliant rolling stock performed no worse or even better than FRA-compliant rolling stock in crashes. Caltrain plans to retain its newer diesel-electric rolling stock for use on the Dumbarton Extension and service south of Tamien.

Caltrain awarded the electrification and EMU contracts at the July 7, 2016 PCJPB board meeting to Balfour Beatty and Stadler Rail, respectively, signaling the start of modernization efforts that will make Caltrain more akin to rapid-transit services such as Bay Area Rapid Transit (BART) than traditional commuter services, and allow the future California High-Speed Rail trains to reach San Francisco utilizing Caltrain tracks. In August 2016, Caltrain ordered sixteen six-car double-decker Stadler KISS electric multiple unit sets from Stadler Rail. The price is $166m for the 16 units, or $551m including an option of 96 more EMU cars.

However, the plans for an electrified Caltrain were put in jeopardy in February 2017 by the Trump administration when US Secretary of Transportation Elaine Chao decided to indefinitely delay granting the federal funding for the Caltrain electrification project that had been approved by the Obama administration. One month later, in March 2017, the American Public Transportation Association (APTA) sent a letter to Secretary Chao calling the Caltrain delay "concerning." In more than two decades, the APTA wrote, "no project has failed to secure final signature after successfully meeting evaluation criteria." In February 2017, Caltrain fired Parsons Transportation Group and sued them for delays in designing the custom technologies necessary for the PTC system. They then went on to sign a contract with Wabtec, who would offer them the industry-standard PTC system.

On April 30, legislators in the United States Congress included $100 million for the Caltrain electrification project in the proposed 2017 federal spending bill, which was signed into law by President Trump on May 6. The $100 million represents the federal funding for fiscal year 2017 of the total $647 million grant, with the balance expected in future years. Secretary Chao claimed she could not sign the grant without the full grant being budgeted, which was disputed by Caltrain and both California Senators Dianne Feinstein and Kamala Harris. On May 22, the FTA announced its intent to sign the funding grant, restoring the final piece of funding for the electrification project. The official grant was finally signed on May 23, and Caltrain broke ground for the Peninsula Corridor Electrification Project on July 21, 2017 in a ceremony attended by local and state officials at the Millbrae station.

In December 2018, it was reported that Caltrain was again behind schedule in installing PTC for the rail corridor, and had requested a two-year extension. The Federal Railroad Administration certified Caltrain's PTC project in December 2020. The first electric trainset was shipped to the Transportation Technology Center for testing in February 2021. In June 2021, Caltrain announced the start of revenue service with electric multiple units would be delayed to late 2024.

In February 2022, the last foundation required for the new overhead catenary system was completed, with the entire line planned to be energised by summer 2022. Testing of the line would then begin using a AEM-7 electric locomotive, with revenue service planned for 2024. On March 10, 2022, a southbound train struck a contractor's crane in San Bruno, injuring 13 people.

Proposed plans

Downtown San Francisco extension

A  tunnel has been proposed to extend Caltrain from its north end in San Francisco at 4th and King to the newly built Transbay Transit Center, closer to the job center of San Francisco and BART, Muni, Transbay AC Transit buses, and long-distance buses. , only the structural "train box" below the Transbay Terminal had been funded and was being built. In April 2012, the Metropolitan Transportation Commission decided to make the remainder of the $2.5 billion extension its top priority for federal funding. The extension would also serve the California High-Speed Rail system.

An alternative proposal, by then-Mayor Ed Lee, would see the existing terminal and trains yards demolished, along with Interstate 280 in Mission Bay, and replaced with infill housing. Caltrain and high-speed rail would be extended to the Transbay Terminal in a new tunnel under Third Street.

In April 2018, the alternative alignment through Mission Bay was rejected in favor of a revised alignment under Pennsylvania Avenue. The new alignment would ultimately join the original alignment near 4th and King Station while tunneling under Pennsylvania Avenue from near 25th Street. The new proposal has an estimated cost of $6 billion.

Dumbarton extension

Caltrain has been chosen to provide commuter rail service on a to-be-rebuilt Dumbarton Rail Corridor across the San Francisco Bay between the Peninsula and Alameda County in the East Bay. This project would add four stations to the Caltrain system: Union City, Fremont-Centerville, Newark, and Menlo Park/East Palo Alto. The two obsolete swing bridges along the corridor would be replaced. Dumbarton Rail was scheduled to start construction in 2009 after a 30-month environmental review and begin service in 2012. SamTrans, one of Caltrain's member agencies, already owns the right-of-way for the Dumbarton Rail Bridge. The bridge has not been used since 1982, when it was still owned by Southern Pacific, and about 33% of the bridge collapsed due to an arson fire in 1998. However, the project's estimated cost doubled between 2004 and 2006, to US$600 million, and is financially problematic. In January 2009, the Metropolitan Transportation Commission instead applied the funds to the BART Warm Springs Extension project in Fremont, delaying the Dumbarton rail project for at least a decade.

South of Gilroy extension

Potential restoration of Del Monte-like service to  had been identified as early as the Caltrans 1984-89 Rail passenger development plan. Amtrak declined to operate such service, but operations under Southern Pacific (by then running state-subsidized services) were studied with ridership forecast developed. Extensions to Hollister have been proposed since at least 2003.

Caltrain was approached by the Transportation Agency for Monterey County (TAMC) to extend service south of Gilroy into Monterey County. A draft environmental impact report stated the lack of public transportation between Monterey County and the Bay Area has resulted in increased private commuter vehicle traffic. Traffic on US Highway 101 was projected to rise by up to 56% in 2020 compared to 1998 levels, resulting in unstable traffic flow from the Salinas city limits to the Santa Clara County line as a result.

The concept of a Caltrain extension to Monterey County has been considered since at least 1996, with the cities of Salinas and Watsonville considering rail station improvements and construction between 1996 and 1998, culminating in a TAMC-sponsored Extension of Caltrain Commuter Service to Monterey County Business Plan in 2000. The proposed extension would create new stations and stops in Pajaro (serving Watsonville in adjacent Santa Cruz County at an estimated cost of ) and Castroville (at an estimated cost of ) before terminating at the existing Salinas Amtrak station with Coast Starlight service. The Salinas station would be rebuilt as an intermodal station to connect commuter rail with Monterey-Salinas Transit buses.

This project depends on state and federal funding availability, a possible local sales tax measure, and an agreement with Union Pacific, the owner of the Salinas-to-Gilroy tracks and right-of-way. This project is managed by TAMC, who released the Final Environment Impact Report (EIR) for this project in 2006. This would complement another plan to re-establish rail service last provided by Southern Pacific's Del Monte Express which operated between Monterey and San Francisco.

In 2009, Caltrain requested that TAMC approach other train operators. TAMC subsequently opened discussions with the Capitol Corridor Joint Powers Authority and the Caltrans Division of Rail to extend Capitol Corridor service south from San Jose to Salinas using the same routing and stations. The switch to Capitol Corridor was cited as an advantage, since CCJPA had experience with commuter trains sharing service on Union Pacific-owned freight right-of-way. Two Capitol Corridor trains would originate from Salinas in the mornings and run through to San Jose and on to Sacramento, with two evening trains making the return trip south to Salinas.

By 2016, plans had shifted in favor of Amtrak California's Capitol Corridor to be the service extended to Salinas station. However, with the awarding of Road Repair and Accountability Act funds in 2018, it was revealed that Caltrain again would operate to Salinas as the first commuter rail service with Capitol Corridor service to follow later. , two daily Caltrain round trips are planned to begin in 2022 after the completion of the Salinas layover facility and trackwork at Gilroy. Future phases will add stations at Pajaro/Watsonville and Castroville, with the potential for up to six daily round trips.

Oakdale infill station

However, without the Downtown Extension, ridership would be limited to less than 100. The 1988 study concluded the preferred site was at Evans Avenue.

The Bayview Hunters Point Community Revitalization Concept Plan (March 2002) identified the Oakdale-Palou area as the community's preferred location for the Caltrain station. With the completion of the Caltrain Express project, service to Paul Avenue was reduced and the station was closed in 2005. The station would be near the Quint Street Lead, which is used by freight trains moving east to the Intermodal Freight Rail Cargo Transfer Facility near Piers 90–96. A follow-up study in 2014 predicted daily ridership of around 2,350.

The Southeast Rail Station Study (SERSS) was released in June 2022 and was endorsed by the San Francisco Planning Commission on July 14. SERSS recommended a new Bayview Station should be located between Oakdale and Jerrold, over alternatives at Evans or at Williams.

Near the proposed station, the Caltrain line is grade-separated from Oakdale (which passes over the rail line) and Quint. Prior to 2016, the rail line was carried over Quint on a steel bridge originally constructed for the Bayshore Cutoff in the early 1900s. In preparation for a new Oakdale station, the bridge over Quint was removed on April 30 and replaced by a berm completed in July 2016, which severed Quint between Oakdale and Jerrold. A new road has been proposed to reconnect Quint to Jerrold on land belonging to Union Pacific, west of the tracks.

California High-Speed Rail
The length of the Caltrain line from Gilroy to San Francisco is part of the planned route of the California High-Speed Rail line. With the adaptation of preferred alternative in July 2019 on the San Jose to Gilroy HSR section, dedicated HSR tracks are planned south of Gilroy station, while HSR would share tracks with Caltrain between San Francisco and Gilroy.

Right of way

The Caltrain right of way between San Francisco and Tamien stations is owned and maintained by its operating agency, the Peninsula Corridor Joint Powers Board (PCJPB). PCJPB purchased the right of way from Southern Pacific (SP) in 1991, while SP maintained rights to inter-city passenger and freight trains. In exchange SP granted PCJPB rights to operate up to 6 trains per day between Tamien and Gilroy stations, later increased to 10 trains per day on a deal with SP's successor Union Pacific (UP) in 2005. Three round-trip freight trains operate daily over the line.

Law enforcement services are provided by a division of the San Mateo County Sheriff's Office, under contract with PCJPB.

Stations

The system has 31 stations. 28 stations are served daily, one (Broadway) is served on weekends only, one (College Park) is served during Bellarmine College Preparatory's commute times on weekdays only, and one (Stanford) is served on Stanford University's football game days only. San Francisco 4th and King Street is the northern terminus of the system, while Gilroy is the southern terminus. However, most trains originate and terminate at Tamien. The five southernmost stations—Capitol, Blossom Hill, Morgan Hill, San Martin, and Gilroy—are served only on weekdays during commute times in the peak direction, going toward San Francisco in the morning and toward Gilroy in the afternoon. Twelve stations are served by the express train service known as Baby Bullet, inaugurated in 2004. Santa Clara station is not long enough to accommodate six-car trains without minor service impacts. Seven stations (Millbrae, Burlingame, San Carlos, Menlo Park, Palo Alto, Santa Clara and San Jose Diridon) are listed on the National Register of Historic Places.

The Southern Pacific Railroad originally built many stations with a side platform on the west side of the tracks to serve southbound trains, plus a narrow island platform between tracks to serve northbound trains. To protect northbound passengers from being struck by southbound trains, Caltrain implemented a "hold-out rule" (GCOR 6.30): if a train is stopped for passengers, an approaching train on another track must wait outside the station. This rule caused numerous delays, especially after the Caltrain Express project added Baby Bullet trains that pass through many stations without stopping. Most stations have been rebuilt (often as part of larger projects) with side platforms or wider island platforms, thus avoiding the hold-out rule. Atherton station was closed altogether in December 2020.

Maintenance and operations facility

The Centralized Equipment Maintenance and Operations Facility is the train maintenance yard and facility serving Caltrain, north of San Jose Diridon station in San Jose. The  maintenance station began construction in 2004 and opened on September 29, 2007. It consolidates much of Caltrain's maintenance and operations into one location.

Ridership and financial data

The Peninsula Corridor Joint Powers Board purchased the right of way between San Francisco and San Jose for $212 million from Southern Pacific in 1991.

Operating expenses and farebox recovery
The operating expenses for fiscal year 2011 were $95,628,000. The fare revenue was $49,026,000, making the farebox recovery ratio 51.3%. This rose to 59% in fiscal year 2012 and 64% in 2013.

Ridership
Caltrain ridership more than doubled between 2005 and 2015. Ridership growth has been linked to the expansion of businesses near Caltrain stations, a shift in attitudes against the use of cars for commuting, and the expansion Caltrain service which has included extra trains and the introduction of fast express services (Baby Bullet service).

Performance
According to the Rail and the California Economy study published in 2017, Caltrain Baby Bullet trains operate with a 95% on-time performance, defined as making stops within ten minutes of published schedules. In addition, Caltrain carries over 4,500 people per hour in each direction, equivalent to two freeway lanes in each direction. At current ridership levels, Caltrain directly removes  of carbon dioxide emissions per day, displacing the equivalent of 10,000 vehicles per day, not counting any ancillary benefit from improved traffic flow resulting from reduced congestion.

Ticketing

Caltrain operates as a proof-of-payment system. Each rider must buy a ticket prior to boarding the train that may or may not be checked during the trip. Tickets can be purchased at ticket vending machines located at all stations, as well as on the Caltrain app. Ticket windows located at San Jose Diridon and Fourth and King were closed in 2005.

One-way tickets expire four hours after purchase, but round-trip tickets ("day passes") are good for unlimited rides within their zone limit until the last train of the day. A joint adult Caltrain/VTA Day Pass, valid through Zone 3 and intended for service to Levi's Stadium, costs an additional $6 and covers fares on VTA buses and light rail, with the exception of VTA Express service. A Zone Upgrade may be purchased to augment a valid one-way ticket, day pass, or monthly pass at $2 per zone, valid for four hours after purchase and in one direction only. Discounted 8-ride tickets and monthly passes are available only with a Clipper card. Caltrain eliminated sales of the 8-ride ticket as of October 1, 2017; existing 8-ride tickets would be honored through the end of October. Seniors (aged 65 years and older), children (aged 17 years or younger), disabled, and Medicare card holders are eligible for a discounted fare at approximately half price (varies depending on the ticket).

Zone fare structure
Caltrain stations are split into six zones. Zone 1 comprises all stations in San Francisco, plus South San Francisco and San Bruno stations in San Mateo County. Zone 2 comprises most stations in San Mateo County. Zone 3 comprises stations in northern Santa Clara County, plus Menlo Park station in San Mateo County. Zone 4 comprises stations in central Santa Clara County. Zones 5 and 6, which are used only during rush hour, comprise stations in southern Santa Clara County.

Fares for Caltrain service are based on the number of zones traveled, which is considered to be the number of zones "touched" between the origin and destination. For instance, a passenger that boards at a Zone 1 station and departs at a Zone 1 station is considered to travel within one zone. A passenger that boards at a Zone 2 station and departs at a Zone 4 station is considered to travel within three zones (Zones 2, 3, and 4). When purchasing a ticket from the station ticket machine, the machine assumes the origin zone is the same as the station's zone, and prompts the passenger to select a destination zone, but the origin zone can be changed if necessary.

Notes

Zone ticketing requires little infrastructure at the stations but can be expensive for passengers making a short trip that crosses a zone boundary (each zone is 13 miles long). Travel between Sunnyvale and Lawrence is a two-zone ride, since Sunnyvale is the southernmost station in Zone 3 and Lawrence is the northernmost station in Zone 4.

Payment
In August 2009 Caltrain became the fifth public transit agency in the San Francisco Bay Area to implement the Clipper card. Monthly passes are implemented exclusively through the Clipper card; in addition, some employer-sponsored annual Go passes are implemented through the Clipper card, starting in January 2019. All passengers who use the electronic Clipper card to ride (including holders of monthly and annual Go passes) must remember to "tag on" with their card prior to boarding and "tag off" with their card after exiting the train. If they board the train without tagging on, they will be subject to the same fines as riders without a ticket. Passengers with monthly passes must tag on and off at least once before the 15th of the month to activate the pass, unless the monthly pass was added through a physical card interaction at a retailer or add value machine.

Without a pass, stored cash on the Clipper card may be used to purchase a one-way ticket. Clipper card users receive a $0.55 discount on the one way full fares. When tagging on, the stored cash value on the Clipper card is debited the maximum one-way fare from the originating zone, where the card was tagged on prior to boarding the train. When tagging off, the stored cash value on the Clipper card is credited according to the destination zone when leaving the train; pass holders are credited the full amount that was debited when tagging off. If passengers who use the Clipper card fail to tag off when they exit the train, they will be charged "the highest cash fare from [their] point of origin", including pass holders. Because of the initial maximum fare debit when tagging on, passengers are required to have at least $1.25 stored cash on the Clipper card to avoid exceeding the card's allowable negative value limit when boarding Caltrain.

For example, if a passenger tags on and boards a northbound or southbound train at San Mateo (Zone 2), their Clipper card will be debited for a five-zone one-way fare (Zone 2 to Zone 6, which is the most distant theoretical destination from the origin point, a one-way fare debit of -$12.20); if that passenger travels south and tags off at Sunnyvale (Zone 3), their Clipper card will be credited for the three zones not traveled (Zones 4, 5, and 6; +$6.75 credit overall) so the net deduction from stored cash is a two-zone one-way fare (Zone 2 to 3, -$5.45 with Clipper cash discount), unless the passenger has a pass; in that case, the passenger would receive a $12.20 credit. In the example given, failing to tag off means the initial five-zone fare debit (Zone 2 to 6, -$12.20) would remain. Because pass holders are credited only when tagging off, pass holders also would be charged the five-zone fare debit if they forget to tag off.

Those who use a clipper card hear one beep or see a light flash when they tag on to begin their journey and see two flashes with a double beep when they tag off to end their trip. Three beeps mean the card does not have valid fare. This ensures Caltrain is universally accessible beyond many other Clipper card acceptance mechanisms.

In 2018, Caltrain rolled out a mobile app allowing riders to purchase fares from Android and iOS smartphones. The Caltrain Mobile app was written by moovel North America, who have written apps with similar functionality for Santa Clara Valley Transportation Agency and San Francisco Municipal Transportation Agency.

Fare enforcement

Before 2018, passengers who were unable to show a viable ticket were subject to fines of up to $250 plus court fees. Approximately 2,100 riders are given verbal warnings or written citations per month for fare evasion, and, while the old system was in place, an average of 15 incidents of violence against conductors occurred every month as a result of fare enforcement. This has led to trains being delayed while waiting for the police to respond. The fines for fare evasion were collected by the superior court system of the county in which the ticket is issued, and were not returned to Caltrain. The complexity of the ticketing system meant that up to 65% of issued fine tickets were later overturned in court.

Caltrain moved to a more streamlined process of issuing citations, effective February 1, 2018. Rather than writing the citation on the spot, which takes up to fifteen minutes, the conductor will scan the photo ID, and an administrative penalty will be mailed to the address on record, bypassing the civil superior court system. In addition, the cost of the fine decreased to $75 per infraction, and Caltrain will retain the fees. However, passengers who accrue a third (or more) fare evasion citation will be subject to traditional fines and/or criminal penalties through the superior court system.

Logos, markings, and liveries
During the initial years as the state was assuming control (1980–1985), locomotives and rolling stock were leased from Southern Pacific. The leased "suburban" and "gallery" coaches continued to wear SP's standard dark grey. Locomotives wore SP's "Bloody Nose" paint scheme.

An experimental scheme was applied to SP/CDTX #3187 and three gallery cars (SP/CDTX #3700, 3701, 3702), unveiled on May 15, 1982; the locomotive had a red nose and both locomotive and cars had the body painted silver (upper half) and dark blue (lower half) blue, separated by three stripes (blue, teal, and red). The scheme was nicknamed "Rainbow", "Postal Service", or "Mailbox".

When new equipment was introduced in 1985, CalTrain adopted a new logo and painted the newly acquired silver EMD F40PH locomotives with teal and blue stripes, matching the colors in the Caltrans logo.

After the new Caltrain logo was adopted in 1997, the F40PH locomotives were repainted to gray with a black roof, and the MPI MP36 locomotives ordered for Baby Bullet service wore gray with red accents.

Train numbering scheme

Currently, each train on the schedule is assigned a three-digit number indicating direction, sequence and stop pattern. This number is not to be confused with the locomotive number, which is the 9xx number physically stenciled on each engine. The stopping scheme (L for local or limited, B for Baby Bullet service) and first digit are displayed on the leading element of the train (either the control car, for northbound trains, or the locomotive, for southbound trains). The practice of placarding train numbers dates back to when the trains were operated by Southern Pacific. The first digit and stopping scheme is posted on the trains as:
 L1 (1xx) Local: approximately 100 min. (all weekday trains make all stops, including service to/from Tamien on selected trains)
 L2 (2xx) Weekend local: 100 min. (all stops, including service to/from Tamien on selected trains)
 L3 (3xx) Limited: 75 min. (limited service in the northern part of the route, and local service for stations south of Hillsdale, except no stops at Santa Clara and San Carlos)
 L4 (4xx) Limited: 75 min. (limited service in the southern part of the route, and local service for stations north of San Mateo, except no stops at South San Francisco and Bayshore)
 L5 (5xx) Limited: 75 min. (12-stop limited service with Baby Bullet stops plus additional stops in San Mateo, Menlo Park, Sunnyvale, Santa Clara, and Tamien)
 L2/L6 (6xx) Holiday / Special: modified schedule for specific holidays, designated as L2, serving all stops; also used as temporary schedule, designated as L6, providing limited-stop service comparable to L3, L4, and L5
 B7 (7xx) Baby Bullet: 65 min. (7-stop limited service: San Jose Diridon, Mountain View, Palo Alto, Redwood City, Hillsdale, Millbrae, and San Francisco 4th and King)

Starting August 30, 2021, Caltrain changed the numbering scheme so the first digit reflects the service scheme and stopping pattern (local, limited, or Baby Bullet/express). The second two digits are incremented sequentially within the service type, and continue to reflect the direction of travel, so even numbers = southbound and odd = northbound. However, because the incrementation was within the service type, trains 101, 301, 401, 501, and 701 all run at different times and are not indicative of the sequence within a day.

The legacy train numbering system also used a three-digit number:
 The first digit for weekday trains was always 1, 2 or 3, indicating stopping pattern. 1xx trains were local trains that made all regular stops. 2xx trains were limited-service trains that skipped some stations. 3xx trains were Baby Bullet trains, and made the fewest stops.
 The first digit for weekend trains was always 4 or 8, also indicating stopping pattern. 4xx trains were local trains that made all stops. 8xx trains were Weekend Baby Bullet trains that made fewer stops.
 The second and third digits indicated the sequence number of the train. For instance, x01 was the first train of the day. These digits also indicated the direction of the train; odd-numbered trains run northbound, and even-numbered trains run southbound. Thus x02 is the first southbound train of the day, x03 is the second northbound train of the day, etc.

Rolling stock

Locomotives
Prior to 1985, Caltrain used equipment leased from Southern Pacific, including SP/CDTX 3187, an EMD GP9 repainted in prototype Caltrain livery and other locomotives that had been used for the Peninsula Commute service. Since 1985, Caltrain has used the following locomotives, which are almost all powered by diesel engines:

Caltrain also leased a number of Amtrak F40PH's in 1998 and 1999 while Caltrain's F40PH-2's were being overhauled.

Passenger cars
Currently, Caltrain trains consist of one locomotive and a five or six-car consist. Trains run in a puller configuration (led by the locomotive) towards San Jose and in a pusher configuration (led by the cab car) towards San Francisco, so the orientation of cars remains consistent. From north to south, Nippon Sharyo five-car gallery consists are arranged as:
 Cab/bike car
 Passenger trailer
 Passenger/luggage trailer
 Bike car
 Passenger trailer
 Locomotive

From north to south, Bombardier bi-level six-car consists are arranged as:
 Cab/bike car
 Passenger trailer
 Passenger/luggage trailer
 Bike car
 Bike car (ex-Metrolink)
 Passenger trailer
 Locomotive

Caltrain has 93 Nippon Sharyo bi-level Gallery-type cars and 41 Bombardier BiLevel Coaches in revenue service as of 2017. Revenue train consists are made of single type of cars; the Bombardier cars are never mixed with the Nippon-Sharyo gallery cars. Of the Gallery cars, 66 are coaches and 27 are bike-accessible cab cars. Caltrans purchased the first 63 gallery cars in 1985 when it began subsidizing the commuter rail service. The other 30 were purchased by Caltrain in 2000, and the older cars were rebuilt by Nippon Sharyo around the same time. Each gallery car has one set of exit doors on each side of the car.

The first 17 Bombardier BiLevel Coaches were purchased as surplus from Sounder Commuter Rail in 2002, of which 10 are coaches, 5 are cab-bike cars, and 2 are cab-wheelchair cars. Caltrain purchased additional eight cars in 2008 to meet short-term passenger growth and to increase spare ratio. These Bombardier cars were initially only used on Baby Bullet express trains, but now also used on limited-stop and local trains.

All five-car Bombardier sets were lengthened to six-car Bombardier sets using surplus ex-Metrolink cars in May 2015. In July 2016, six-car Bombardier sets replaced some five-car gallery sets to relieve overcrowding. In November 2016, Caltrain rolled out six-car gallery sets for certain trains to further relieve overcrowding; the longer trains are intended to be temporary measures to increase capacity until more frequent service can be achieved with electrification.

Ex-Metrolink cars

Caltrain purchased 16 used Bombardier BiLevel Coaches from Metrolink in 2014 to cope with increasing ridership by lengthening certain Bombardier sets from five to six cars. The $15 million purchase was financed by a farebox revenue fund. Since the cars had retired from Metrolink service, they required up to a year of rehabilitation before being placed in service with Caltrain. The ex-Metrolink cars were of older Series 1 and 2 that have riveted bodies, instead of the welded bodies in the Series 6 and 7 cars that Caltrain had purchased starting from 2002.

Four of the cars were put into service in May 2015 while other cars await their refurbishments. Ex-Metrolink cars have retained their Metrolink blue-on-white livery, but Metrolink logos have been painted over and rolling stock numbers have been repainted with JPBX numbers.

Ex-VRE Budd cars 
Caltrain bought 14 remanufactured Budd Rail Diesel Car ("Boise Budd") single-level cars from Virginia Railway Express around 2000 for use on Special-Event trains. A seven-car special train took fans to the first game at Pac Bell Park on March 31, 2000. The northbound train ran at an estimated 125% of capacity and skipped stops after Hillsdale because it was already well above seated capacity. These cars were sold in 2005 after Bombardier cars were delivered and are now in service on the Grand Canyon Railway.

Electric Multiple Units

In August 2016, Caltrain awarded a $551 million contract to produce the trainsets needed for running on the electrified line – 96 Stadler KISS EMUs arranged into 16 trainsets will be delivered for testing by August 2019. Under the contract, Caltrain had the option to procure an additional 96 units in the future for an additional $385 million. In December 2018, Caltrain was reportedly carrying 65,000 passengers a day, and expected to have 240,000 daily riders in 2040. Therefore, after funding was received from the California State Transportation Agency's Transit and Intercity Rail Capital Program, Caltrain's board unanimously approved the purchase of additional cars from Stadler to increase the fleet from 16 six-car sets to 19 seven-car sets.

Acceleration of the EMUs should be substantially better than current trains.

The first Stadler KISS was completed by Stadler's Salt Lake City factory in July 2020. It was taken to the Transportation Technology Center in Pueblo, Colorado, for high-speed testing.

Miscellaneous/Maintenance-of-Way
Caltrain has several cars used for track maintenance, such as JPBX 505, a track geometry car. Some other rolling stock is infrequently used for special service, such as on the Holiday Train, an annual non-revenue train decorated with lights, carrying volunteer carolers, and making limited stops for toy donations.

Intermodal connections

Inter-City, Regional and Commuter rail
Caltrain has direct connections to three regional rail services; Bay Area Rapid Transit (BART) (with service to San Francisco, SFO, Oakland, Fremont, Richmond, Dublin, Concord, and Pittsburg) at Millbrae, Amtrak's Capitol Corridor and Coast Starlight trains, as well as the Altamont Corridor Express at San Jose Diridon station and the Santa Clara Transit Center.

The future San Jose BART extension would also introduce connecting BART service at Diridon station and Santa Clara station. The proposed Downtown Rail Extension, if completed, would connect Caltrain and the California High-Speed Rail project to BART in San Francisco proper through an underground pedestrian walkway between Caltrain platforms at the Salesforce Transit Center and BART'sEmbarcadero station.

Bus/Light rail
Caltrain is served by a number of local bus/rail systems. These systems include the San Francisco Municipal Railway (Muni), San Mateo County Transit District (SamTrans) and Santa Clara Valley Transportation Authority (VTA). (Additionally, Golden Gate Transit of Marin and Sonoma Counties is within 20 minutes' walking distance, or a short Muni ride via the N or T lines, from Caltrain's northern terminus.)

In August 2005, as part of its Vasona light rail project, VTA light rail established its third transfer point with Caltrain at San Jose's central train station Diridon. In addition to many bus connections, VTA light rail service has two other Caltrain transfer points at San Jose's Tamien and at Mountain View. (Also, the Cottle light rail stop in southern San Jose is a mile from Caltrain's Blossom Hill station.)

The San Francisco Municipal Railway (Muni) has two light rail connections, the N Judah and T Third Street lines, at separate stops near the San Francisco 4th and King station. Muni intended to establish another light rail connection to the Bayshore station at Visitacion Valley in southern San Francisco for the T Third line, but this has been delayed indefinitely due to cost and design issues. The T Third opened on April 18, 2007 without the connection to Bayshore station. If the aforementioned Downtown Rail Extension is completed, the underground walkway between the Salesforce Transit Center and Embarcadero station would also connect Caltrain to Muni Metro's F Market & Wharves, J Church, K Ingleside, and M Ocean View, as well as providing a second connection to the N Judah and linking Caltrain with the California street cable car line. The extension to the Salesforce Transit Center would also directly link Caltrain with more Muni bus routes, transbay buses operated by AC Transit and Golden Gate Transit, and intercity buses operated by Greyhound and Megabus, as well as place Caltrain within walking distance of the Ferry Building.

Airport
Caltrain passengers may transfer to BART or SamTrans at the Millbrae Intermodal Station for travel to San Francisco International Airport (SFO).

Prior to the opening of the airport extension in 2003 a free shuttle bus operated between Millbrae and the airport. On June 24, 2018, SamTrans launched Route SFO, which provides service using buses equipped with luggage racks between the station platform at Millbrae and regular samTrans SFO terminal stops. Fares on Route SFO match samTrans local pricing.

Caltrain passengers can connect to San Jose International Airport via VTA bus No. 60 at the Santa Clara Transit Center.

Since Caltrain does not run in the East Bay, connections to Oakland International Airport must utilize BART's Oakland Airport connector at Coliseum station, itself reachable by boarding a red line train at Millbrae and subsequently transferring to a blue or green line train between Daly City and West Oakland, or by transferring to VTA light rail's orange line at Mountain View and transferring to green or orange line BART services at Milpitas. Passengers can also board the AC Transit system in Hillsdale or Palo Alto via their respective Caltrain stations.

Regional express bus
Caltrain is also served by AC Transit from Hayward at the Hillsdale station (Line M) and at Palo Alto station (Line U). This is in addition to the Dumbarton Express from Union City/Fremont at Palo Alto. Furthermore, Amtrak's Highway 17 Express bus from Santa Cruz and Monterey-Salinas Transit from Monterey at San Jose, as well as San Benito County Express from Hollister at Gilroy.

Bus shuttle
Caltrain sponsors many shuttle routes serving local employers on the Peninsula and in Silicon Valley. Shuttle connections via the Stanford Marguerite Shuttle are available to Stanford University at the Palo Alto and California Avenue stations and San Jose State University at the San Jose station.

Bicycle access

Caltrain was one of the first commuter rail services to add bicycle capacity to its trains, inaugurating bicycle service in 1992 by allowing four bikes on certain trains.

Bicycle policies
All bicycle rack-equipped cars have a yellow "Bike Car" sign posted by the door. Cyclists are required to tie their bicycle to the rack with the bungee cord provided, and must be racked so they do not protrude into the aisle. Each rack can accommodate four bicycles. Because the bikes are stacked together against the racks, most riders place a destination tag, available from a conductor, on their bicycles to optimize placement and minimize shuffling.

Cyclists must be at least six years old, and cyclists younger than 12 must be accompanied by an adult and capable of carrying their own bike on and off the train. Bulky attachments such as training wheels, trailers, saddlebags, and baskets are similarly not allowed. Folding bicycles are not restricted and can be carried on any car when folded; they may not be placed on seats or block aisles.

The variation on bicycle capacity between trainsets has generated criticisms from the bicycling community, as cyclists may be denied boarding when a train reaches its bicycle capacity. The Baby Bullets, favored by many cyclists, often use lower bike-capacity Bombardier cars and cyclists may have to wait for slower trains with higher-capacity gallery cars, or seek alternate transportation.

Due to equipment rotation and maintenance concerns, Caltrain said in 2009 that it could not dedicate cars with higher bike capacity on trains with high bike demand. Eventually, two bike cars were added to every train consist by 2011, and in 2016, a third bike car was added to Bombardier consists.

To provide an alternative to bringing bicycles on board the trains, Caltrain has installed bicycle lockers at most stations, and constructed a new bicycle station at the San Francisco station. In early 2008, Caltrain sponsored Warm Planet bicycle station opened at the 4th and Townsend terminus. A bicycle station was open at the Palo Alto station from April 1999 to October 2004, and reopened in February 2007. Nearly all stations have racks and/or lockers available to park bicycles.

Bicycle cars
The initial pilot program launched in 1992 allowed up to four bikes per train for off-peak service, with bicycles were carried in the cab car (northernmost car). Bicycle capacity was expanded to twelve bikes per train for all trains in 1995, followed by a doubling to 24 bikes per train for all trains in 1996.

Starting in 2001, gallery cars were modified for bicycle service. Gallery cars modified for bicycle service removed seats from the lower level in the north half of the car, resulting in space to carry 32 bicycles per car. By 2006, Bombardier cars were also modified for bicycle service by partially removed seats from the lower level of the car, resulting in space to carry 16 bicycles per car.

It was suggested that Caltrain could increase bicycle capacity by removing some seats from bicycle cars. Initially Caltrain rejected this idea because some trains are operated at seated capacity and the seat removal would take space from other passengers. However, in early 2009 Caltrain announced that it would be expanding bicycle capacity by 8 spots by removing some seats in the bike cars, bringing bike capacity to 40 bikes on gallery cars and 24 bikes on Bombardier cars. The expansion started several months later. After this, bike capacity on trains was expanded by increasing the number of bike cars in a consist, rather than further modifying cars.

Train consists
At first, only the cab/control car (the northernmost car) of each train consist was modified for bicycle service. Prior to 2009, Bombardier consists could carry 16 bicycles, and gallery consists could carry 32 bicycles. With the removal of additional seats in 2009, capacity rose to 24 and 40 bicycles, respectively.

In the fall of 2009, all Bombardier consists and some gallery consists substituted a second bike car for one of the passenger trailers. The remaining gallery consists continued with a single bike car, resulting in a carrying capacity of 48 bicycles (on Bombardier consists) or 40–80 bicycles (on gallery consists with one or two bike cars). Due to demand, in 2011, the remaining gallery sets modified a passenger trailer to take bicycles, giving two bike cars to all consists, increasing capacity on all gallery consists to 80 bicycles per train. 10 gallery trailer cars, 3826-3835, had their lower-level seats removed in 2011. Although the Baby Bullet runs initially used five-car Bombardier consists, many of the Baby Bullet runs returned to five-car gallery sets due to their superior bicycle capacity, since demand for bicycle car access was high.

Prior to 2016, both Bombardier and gallery trains used five-car consists. With the purchase of Bombardier cars from Metrolink, Caltrain announced in January 2015 that roughly half of the additional ex-Metrolink cars will be converted to bike cars with capacity for 24 bikes, so some trains running Bombardier cars will be six-car consists, of which three will be bike cars.

Six-car Bombardier consists started running in May 2015, but the third car was not converted for bike service until March 2016. Five of the Bombardier cars were refurbished as bike cars and entered service in March 2016. All Bombardier consists are now six-car sets with three bike cars and three passenger cars. The third bike car is just south of the existing southern bike car. The third bike car is being placed next to the other bike car to help conductors to manage bike capacity. Official bike capacity for six-car Bombardier consists is 72 (24 bikes × 3 cars), comparable to the 80-bike capacity of five-car gallery consists (40 bikes × 2 cars).

See also
 List of San Francisco Bay Area trains
 South Bay Historical Railroad Society
 Southern Pacific Peninsula Commute
 Southern Pacific Railroad

References

External links

 
 
 

 
Passenger rail transportation in California
California railroads
Commuter rail in the United States
Public transportation in San Francisco
Public transportation in San Mateo County, California
Public transportation in Santa Clara County, California
Standard gauge railways in the United States
25 kV AC railway electrification